is a Japanese actress.

Filmography
 School Ghost Stories (1995) as Kaori Komuro
 Ogyā (2002) Hana
 Azumi (2003) Yae
 Munraito jierifisshu (2004) Minamida Keiko
 Metasequoia no ki no shita de (2005) Okamoto Sachiko
 Metro ni notte (2006) Karube Michiko

TV Drama
 Gakkō no kaidan: Haru no tatari special (1999)
 Ringu: Saishūshō (1999), as Ooishi Tomoko
 Ōdorī (Audrey オードリー) (2001-2002), asadora
 Hontoni atta kowai hanashi (2004)
 Engine (2005) as Suenaga Tamaki

Voice Roles
 Tokyo Godfathers (2003) Miyuki

References

External links

1982 births
Actresses from Tokyo
Japanese film actresses
Japanese television actresses
Japanese voice actresses
Living people
Asadora lead actors
20th-century Japanese actresses
21st-century Japanese actresses